São Tomé and Príncipe competed at the 2013 World Championships in Athletics in Moscow, Russia, from 10 to 18 August 2013. A team of one athlete, Christopher Lima da Costa, was represented the country in the event.

References

External links
IAAF World Championships – São Tomé and Príncipe

Nations at the 2013 World Championships in Athletics
World Championships in Athletics
São Tomé and Príncipe at the World Championships in Athletics